2011 Regional League Division 2 North-East Region is the 3rd season of the League competition since its establishment in 2009. It is in the third tier of the Thai football league system. The league winners and runners up will qualify for the 2011 Regional League Division 2 championship stage.

Changes from Last Season

Team Changes

Promoted Clubs

Buriram were promoted to the 2011 Thai Division 1 League after winning the 2010 Regional League Division 2 championship pool.

Expansion Clubs

Amnat Charoen Town joined the newly expanded league setup.

Serving Bans

Ubon United are in the second year of their two-year ban.

Stadium and locations

Standings table

References

External links
 Football Association of Thailand

Regional League North-East Division seasons
North